Stigmella prunetorum is a moth of the family Nepticulidae. It is found in all of Europe (except Ireland, the Iberian Peninsula and the Mediterranean islands).

The wingspan is 4.3-4.7 mm. Adults are on wing in May.

The larvae feed on Prunus armeniaca, Prunus avium, Prunus brigantina, Prunus cerasifera, Prunus cerasus, Prunus cocomilia, Prunus domestica, Prunus insititia, Prunus spinosa and Prunus triloba. They mine the leaves of their host plant. The mine consists of a corridor, running in several half or whole circles around the oviposition (egg laying) site. The last segment breaks loose, and mostly runs along the leaf margin.

References

External links
bladmineerders.nl
Fauna Europaea

Nepticulidae
Moths of Europe
Moths described in 1855